Nadim Souaid (born 20 August 1986) is a Lebanese basketball player for Hekmeh BC of the Lebanese Basketball League. He played in the 2011-12 with Bejjeh SC and he averaged 18.9 ppg, 7.1 rebounds, 3.2 assists and 1.6 steals. In 2012-13 season Nadim played for Champville SC and he averaged 9.5 ppg, 3.7 rebounds and 2 assists. In the 2013-14 season Nadim played for Tadamon Zouk and he averaged 14.2 ppg, 3.5 rebounds and 2.9 assists. Nadim is also a member of the Lebanon national basketball team, with whom he competed with at the 2013 William Jones Cup. He signed with Homenetmen BC in 2015. In 2017 he signed with Sagesse Club. However, in July 2018, Souaid joined Champville SC

External links
 eurobasket.com

1986 births
Living people
Lebanese men's basketball players
Shooting guards
Sagesse SC basketball players